Yusuf Sarai   is a locality in South Delhi. It lies on the Sri Aurobindo Marg close to AIIMS, New Delhi, and accommodates both residential  as well as market places  . It is named after historic Yusuf Sarai, one of many sarais (inns or rest houses) which were built in area during and Delhi Sultanate period, including, Katwaria Sarai, Lado Sarai, Sheikh Sarai and Kallu Sarai .

History
The main road in this area is Sri Aurobindo Marg. It is on the stretch between AIIMS and Safdarjung Hospital on one end and Green Park Metro Station on the other. The stretch has shops on either side. On one side, it leads to 'Mandir of Shiv Ji maharaj built by Ch. Prabhu dayal & Ch.khubi ram jat & now this place around this mandir is famous as Mandir wali Gali, a flea market and on the other side, a road leads to Niti Park. The area is termed as an urban village. Yusuf Sarai is famous for guest houses since 1908, one can find cheap and nice Place to stay here rooms ranging from Rs. 400 onwards (subject to change) and some Pocket Friendly Local Dhaba's also here to eat some Pure vegetarian restaurants also available here. The people come from other states of India and outside India to AIIMS (famous Hospital) just 1 km from Yusuf Sarai and they stay here in Yusuf Sarai.

Transport
The nearest station of Delhi Metro is Green Park on Yellow Line. Delhi Transport Corporation (DTC) Buses also available here for some of local places in Delhi.

Adjoining areas
 Ansari Nagar
 Gautam nagar
 Green Park extn.
 Gulmohar enclave
 Gulmohar Park
 Hauz Khas

References

Cities and towns in South Delhi district
South Delhi district
Caravanserais in India